Ryan Wiggins (born 30 January 1984) is a Barbadian cricketer. He made his first-class debut for Barbados in the 2016–17 Regional Four Day Competition on 15 April 2017. In June 2021, he was selected to take part in the Minor League Cricket tournament in the United States following the players' draft.

References

External links
 

1984 births
Living people
Barbadian cricketers
Barbados cricketers
Combined Campuses and Colleges cricketers